Based on the U.S. Board on Geographic Names, there are at least 20 named National and State Forests in Montana.  In addition to currently named forests, there are at least 22 former named forests that have been consolidated into current forest lands.

National Forests are administered by the United States Forest Service, an agency of the United States Department of Agriculture.  Montana State Forests are administered by the Montana Department of Natural Resources and Conservation.

Current forests

State forests

 Clearwater State Forest, Missoula County, Montana, el.  
 Coal Creek State Forest, Flathead County, Montana, el.  
 Lincoln State Forest, Lewis and Clark County, Montana, el.  
 Stillwater State Forest, Flathead County, Montana, el.  
 Sula State Forest, Ravalli County, Montana, el.  
 Swan River State Forest, Lake County, Montana, el.  
 Thompson River State Forest, Sanders County, Montana, el.

National forests
 Beaverhead National Forest, Beaverhead County, Montana, el.  
 Bitterroot National Forest, Ravalli County, Montana, el.  
 Custer National Forest, Powder River County, Montana, el.  
 Deerlodge National Forest, Jefferson County, Montana, el.  
 Flathead National Forest, Flathead County, Montana, el.  
 Gallatin National Forest, Park County, Montana, el.  
 Gallatin Petrified Forest, Gallatin County, Montana, el.  
 Helena National Forest, Lewis and Clark County, Montana, el.  
 Kaniksu National Forest, Sanders County, Montana, el.  
 Kootenai National Forest, Lincoln County, Montana, el.  
 Lewis and Clark National Forest, Meagher County, Montana, el.  
 Lolo National Forest, Sanders County, Montana, el.

Other forests 

 The Lubrecht Experimental Forest is managed by the W.A. Franke College of Forestry & Conservation at the University of Montana. The forest is in Missoula County, Montana, el. .

Former national forests
 Absaroka National Forest, now part of Lewis and Clark National Forest and Gallatin National Forest (1945)
 Beartooth National Forest, now part of Custer National Forest (1932)
 Big Belt National Forest, now part of Helena National Forest and Gallatin National Forest (1908) 
 Big Hole National Forest, now part of Beaverhead, Deerlodge and Bitterroot National Forests (1908) 
 Blackfeet National Forest, now part of Flathead National Forest and Kootenai National Forest (1935) 
 Cabinet National Forest, now part of Kaniksu, Kootenai and Lolo National Forests (1954) 
 Crazy Mountain National Forest, now part of Lewis and Clark National Forest (1908) 
 Ekalaka National Forest, now part of Custer National Forest (1908) 
 Elkhorn National Forest, now part of Helena National Forest (1908) 
 Flathead Forest Reserve, now part of Flathead National Forest and Lewis and Clark National Forest (1903) 
 Hell Gate National Forest, now part of Beaverhead, Deerlodge, Missoula and Bitterroot National Forests (1908) 
 Highwood Mountains National Forest, now part of Lewis and Clark National Forest (1908) 
 Jefferson National Forest (Montana), now part of Lewis and Clark National Forest (1932) 
 Little Belt National Forest, now part of Lewis and Clark National Forest (1908) 
 Little Rockies National Forest, now part of Lewis and Clark National Forest (1908) 
 Long Pine National Forest, now part of Custer National Forest (1908) 
 Madison National Forest, now part of Beaverhead, Gallatin and Deerlodge National Forests (1931) 
 Missoula National Forest, now part of Lolo National Forest and Deerlodge National Forest (1931) 
 Otter National Forest, now part of Custer National Forest (1908) 
 Pryor Mountains National Forest, now part of Custer National Forest (1908) 
 Sioux National Forest, now part of Custer National Forest (1920) 
 Snowy Mountains National Forest, now part of Lewis and Clark National Forest (1908)

Notes

National Forests of Montana
Former National Forests of Montana
Montana state forests